This is a list of members of the Victorian Legislative Assembly from 1982 to 1985, as elected at the 1982 state election:

 In May 1982, the Labor member for Keilor, Jack Ginifer, resigned due to being diagnosed with a terminal illness. Labor candidate George Seitz won the resulting by-election on 17 July 1982.
 In November 1982, the Liberal member for Malvern and former Premier of Victoria, Lindsay Thompson, resigned. Liberal candidate Geoff Leigh won the resulting by-election on 4 December 1982.
 On 28 January 1983, the Labor member for Springvale, Kevin King, died. Labor candidate Eddie Micallef won the resulting by-election on 19 March 1983.
 In March 1983, the Liberal member for Warrnambool, Ian Smith, resigned to contest Liberal preselection for the Wannon federal by-election (as it turned out, he lost to David Hawker). Liberal candidate Adam Kempton won the resulting by-election on 7 May 1983.
 In March 1983, the Liberal member for Swan Hill, Alan Wood, resigned. Nationals candidate Barry Steggall won the resulting by-election on 7 May 1983.
 The Court of Disputed Returns found in 1984 that the Labor member for Morwell, Valerie Callister, was a member of the Environment Council at the time of her election and the Solicitor-General advised that her seat had become vacant. However, a by-election was not held as the Legislative Assembly passed a resolution to excuse her under s.61A of the Constitution Act.

Members of the Parliament of Victoria by term
20th-century Australian politicians